Chryso is a village and a community in the municipal unit of Viniani in Evrytania, Greece. It is located in the Agrafa mountains, near the Tourla rapids. In 2011 its population was 42 for the village and 49 for the community, which includes the village Agios Konstantinos. Chryso is located 6 km north of Viniani and 17 km northwest of Karpenisi. The dominant vegetation around Chryso is fir trees. There are many springs near the village, that feed the village water mill. Not many old buildings have been preserved in Chryso, because the village was burned in 1942 by the Italian occupiers and an earthquake in 1966 destroyed many of the remaining buildings. There are three old churches and two 15th century stone bridges over the small river called Chrysiotis.

Historical population

See also 

 List of settlements in Evrytania

References

External links
Chryso on GTP Travel Pages (in English and Greek)

Populated places in Evrytania